Black Widow: A Land Bleeds is an Indian film directed by Dinkar Rao. The plot is about a widow working as a prostitute in Mumbai. The film completed shooting and postproduction and then faced many problems. Its release was significantly delayed due to a ruling by the Central Board of Film Certification.

References

External links
 

2017 films
Indian drama films
Films about prostitution in India
English-language Indian films